Mimic is a 1997 American science fiction horror film directed by Guillermo del Toro, written by del Toro and Matthew Robbins based on Donald A. Wollheim's short story of the same name, and starring Mira Sorvino, Jeremy Northam, Josh Brolin, Charles S. Dutton, Giancarlo Giannini and F. Murray Abraham.

Plot
In New York City, cockroaches are spreading the deadly "Strickler's disease" that is claiming hundreds of the city's children. Due to an inability to develop a cure or vaccine for the disease Dr. Peter Mann, deputy director of the CDC, recruits entomologist Dr. Susan Tyler. In response, Dr. Tyler uses genetic engineering to create what she calls the "Judas breed", a hybrid between a mantis and a termite that releases an enzyme which accelerates the roaches' metabolism, with the effect that the roaches burn calories faster than they can nourish themselves and thus starve to death. The roaches carrying the disease are successfully eradicated, and Peter and Susan later marry.

Three years later, a priest is chased and dragged underground by a strange assailant. The only witness is Chuy, a boy on the autism spectrum with a habit of imitating noises who refers to the attacker as "Mr. Funny Shoes" to his disbelieving guardian, an immigrant subway shoe shiner named Manny. Later two kids sell a "weird bug" from the subway to Susan, which she performs tests on, and realizes is similar to the Judas breed. Initially, she believes that this is impossible since the specimens she released were all female and designed with a lifespan of only a few months, which should have ensured that the breed would die off after a single generation. Before she can examine the insect further it is stolen by a strange figure who escapes out the window. After informing the police she later consults with her mentor, Dr. Gates, who autopsies a larger specimen found in the city's sewage treatment plants, and finds that its organs are fully formed, meaning the Judas breed is not only alive but has developed into a viable species, with a sizable colony underneath the city.

Looking for more valuable specimens, the kids go down the tracks where they find a large egg sac and are then killed by the same strange assailant. Meanwhile, Chuy enters the abandoned church of the dead priest to find "Mr. Funny Shoes" and is abducted. Peter, his assistant Josh and MTA officer Leonard enter the maintenance tunnels to investigate but Peter and Leonard get stuck and send Josh for help. Susan encounters what appears to be a shadowy man in a trench coat on a train platform. As she approaches it, the figure unfolds into an insect the size of a human being. The creature abducts Susan and carries her into the tunnels. Meanwhile, Josh finds a way out but is found by a Judas and killed. Manny also enters the tunnels in search of Chuy and comes across Susan, whom he rescues along with Peter and Leonard, and they barricade themselves inside a train car.

Susan surmises that the Judas breed's accelerated metabolism has allowed them to reproduce at a similarly accelerated rate, causing them to evolve over tens of thousands of generations within only three years, developing lungs, allowing increased size, and the ability to mimic their human prey. The group formulates a plan to get the car moving: using the remains of a dead bug to mask their scent as they work Peter will switch the power on, and Manny will switch the tracks. Susan projects that the Judas will spread throughout the tunnels and overrun the city unless they are able to kill the colony's single fertile male. While trying to reach the track switches, Manny finds Chuy who has managed to survive due to his imitating the clicking noises the bugs use for communication, but before they can escape Manny is killed by the male Judas. Susan, realizing Manny has been gone too long, goes in search of him but finds only Chuy. Leonard's injured leg starts bleeding heavily and knowing the smell will only incite the creatures and endanger the group, he creates a diversion that allows the others to get away, before being killed. Peter finds a dumbwaiter and puts Susan and Chuy in it, but stays behind to destroy the breed for good. He is chased into a room where hundreds are nesting and blows them all up by setting fire to a loose gas pipe, before diving underwater to safety.

The male Judas however escapes the blast and goes after Chuy but is distracted by Susan, who lures it into the path of an oncoming train, which runs over it. The two successfully make it to the surface, with Susan assuming that Peter had died in the blast. She then sees what appears to be another Judas, only for it to be revealed to actually be Peter alive and well. The film ends with the three reuniting and embracing one another.

Cast

 Mira Sorvino as Dr. Susan Tyler
 Jeremy Northam as Dr. Peter Mann
 Josh Brolin as Josh Maslow
 Charles S. Dutton as Officer Leonard Norton
 Giancarlo Giannini as Manny Gavoila
 F. Murray Abraham as Dr. Gates
 Norman Reedus as Jeremy
 Julian Richings as Workman
 Doug Jones as Long John #2
 Alexander Goodwin as Chuy Gavoila
 Alix Koromzay as Remy Panos
 James Costa as Ricky
 Javon Barnwell as Davis

Production

Casting
The character of Manny was originally written by del Toro for one of his favorite actors, Argentinian Federico Luppi, whom he directed in Cronos. However, Luppi's English pronunciation was not good enough for the film, so del Toro chose Giancarlo Giannini instead; in a 2013 interview del Toro confirmed the story and stated that what he misses the most about working in the Spanish language is the possibility of directing Luppi, for whom del Toro professes the utmost admiration.

Two of the film's actors, Josh Brolin and Alix Koromzay, had previously starred in Nightwatch, another Dimension/Miramax horror film from 1997. Its director, Ole Bornedal, served as a producer on Mimic. The film features Norman Reedus in his Hollywood debut.

Filming
Principal photography occurred in Toronto, Canada, due to the city's similarities to New York. The film includes several examples of del Toro's most characteristic hallmarks: "I have a sort of a fetish for insects, clockwork, monsters, dark places, and unborn things", said del Toro, and this is evident in Mimic, where at times all are combined in long, brooding shots of dark, cluttered, muddy chaotic spaces. According to Alfonso Cuarón, del Toro's friend and colleague, "with Guillermo the shots are almost mathematical — everything is planned".

After Miramax boss Bob Weinstein saw early footage, there were fights between him and del Toro regarding the tone, with Weinstein claiming the film was not scary enough.  It has been reported that one day Weinstein was so infuriated with del Toro that he stormed onto the Toronto set and attempted to instruct del Toro on "how to direct a movie". Weinstein would eventually try to get del Toro fired. Following an intervention from lead actress Mira Sorvino, Weinstein backed down, and principal photography would be completed with del Toro as director in early 1997. However, Weinstein still insisted on having control over the final cut. Producer B.J. Rack later compared making the film to "being a prisoner of [a] war camp", while del Toro stated in 2018:  "The only time I have experienced bad behaviour, and it remains one of the worst experiences of my life, was in 1997, when I did Mimic for Miramax. It was a horrible, horrible, horrible experience".

Release

Director's cut 
Del Toro was not granted final cut privilege, and he did not approve of the film as released. In 2010, del Toro revealed that he had been working on a director's cut of Mimic and said: "It’s not exactly the movie I wanted to do, but it definitely healed a lot of wounds... I am happy with the cut". The director's cut runs for 112 minutes, six minutes longer than the theatrical release. It was released in 2011, initially exclusive to Blu-ray and is now available via various digital services, but has never been widely available on DVD.

Reception

Box office
According to Box Office Mojo, its domestic gross is $25,480,490; it did not beat its budget of $30,000,000.

Critical response
Mimic received mixed reviews from critics. It currently holds a 67% 'Fresh' rating on Rotten Tomatoes based on 45 reviews, with an average score of 6.4 out of 10. The site's critics consensus reads: "Mimic finds director Guillermo del Toro struggling to inject his unique sensibilities into a studio picture – and delivering just enough genre thrills to recommend".

Roger Ebert gave the movie 3 1/2 stars saying "Del Toro is a director with a genuine visual sense, with a way of drawing us into his story and evoking the mood with the very look and texture of his shots. He takes the standard ingredients and presents them so effectively that "Mimic" makes the old seem new, fresh and scary".

Audiences polled by CinemaScore gave the film an average grade of "C−" on an A+ to F scale.

Short film
Mimic was planned as one of three 30-minute short films intended to be shown together. It was expanded into a full-length movie, as was Impostor. The short film Alien Love Triangle remains a 30-minute short film, and has never been released.

Sequels

Two direct-to-video sequels were made, neither of which involved del Toro.

TV series 
In , a television adaptation/reboot was announced to be in development, with Paul W. S. Anderson directing the pilot. Anderson and Jeremy Bolt are executive producers, along with Jim Danger Gray who will also be showrunner of the series.

See also
 Aggressive mimicry

References

External links
 
 
 

1997 films
1997 horror films
1990s monster movies
1990s science fiction horror films
American monster movies
American natural horror films
American science fiction horror films
Fictional cockroaches
Films about insects
Films about autism
Films set in New York City
Films shot in Toronto
Films directed by Guillermo del Toro
Films scored by Marco Beltrami
Films with screenplays by Guillermo del Toro
Films with screenplays by Matthew Robbins
Dimension Films films
Films about genetic engineering
1990s English-language films
1990s American films